Gokulbhai Daulatram Bhatt (19 February 1898 – 6 October 1986) born in Hathal (Sirohi) was a freedom fighter and a social worker from Rajasthan state in India. He was a member of Constituent Assembly of India representing Bombay State and chief minister of princely Sirohi state for a brief period.

He along with seven others founded Praja Mandal at Sirohi on 22 January 1939 and was an active independence activist from Sirohi and was detained and put in jail for some time by British. After independence he opposed the division of Sirohi district and handover of Mount Abu to Gujarat. As a result of which Mount Abu remained part of Rajasthan, however, some other parts of district were transferred to Gujarat. He fought for empowerment of backward class 

He was awarded Padma Bhushan award by the Government of India in 1971 and the Jamnalal Bajaj Award for Constructive Work, in 1982 

He was arrested during the emergency for his vocal protest of emergency. In the jail he  started satyagraha  with other satyagrahis and people like Professor Kedar, Ujjwala Arora, Bhairon Singh Shekhawat and others. He was called as Gandhi of Rajasthan.

References

External links 
 
 
 
 

Recipients of the Padma Bhushan in social work
Indian independence activists from Rajasthan
People from Sirohi district
1898 births
Social workers
Indians imprisoned during the Emergency (India)
Members of the Constituent Assembly of India
1986 deaths
Administrators in the princely states of India
Prisoners and detainees of British India
Social workers from Rajasthan